Curtis D. Mohl (born October 12, 1959) is a former American football offensive tackle who played in the United States Football League (USFL). He played college football for UCLA, and was drafted by the Oakland Raiders in the ninth round of the 1981 NFL Draft. He played for the Boston Breakers of the USFL in 1981.

Professional career
Mohl was drafted by the Oakland Raiders in the ninth round (248th overall) of the 1981 NFL Draft. He was waived before the start of the regular season on August 13, 1981.

Mohl signed with the Winnipeg Blue Bombers of the Canadian Football League on February 16, 1982, but ultimately did not play for the team. He signed with the Baltimore Colts during training camp, but was released for being late to a practice on July 30, 1982.

Mohl signed with the Arizona Wranglers of the USFL on October 28, 1982. He was waived by the team on February 27, 1983. He signed with the Boston Breakers in April 1983.

Mohl signed with the Philadelphia Stars on November 7, 1983. He was waived/injured by the team with a knee injury on February 7, 1984.

Personal
Mohl is married to Valerie Red-Horse.

References

External links
ProFootballArchives bio

1959 births
Living people
American football offensive tackles
UCLA Bruins football players
Oakland Raiders players
Winnipeg Blue Bombers players
Baltimore Colts players
Arizona Wranglers players
Boston/New Orleans/Portland Breakers players
Philadelphia/Baltimore Stars players